Werner Baumbach (27 December 1916 – 20 October 1953) was a German bomber pilot during World War II. He commanded the secret bomber wing Kampfgeschwader 200 (KG 200) of the Luftwaffe, the air force of Nazi Germany.

Career
Baumbach entered the Luftwaffe in 1936 and, after initial training at the 2nd Air Warfare School (Fliegerhorst Gatow), was trained as a bomber pilot. He was one of the first pilots to fly the Junkers Ju 88 bomber and flew various bombing missions with Kampfgeschwader 30 (KG 30). On 19 April 1940, he bombed and damaged the French cruiser Émile Bertin for which he was awarded the Iron Cross 1st Class.

In 1942, Baumbach was removed from active pilot duty and started working on new bomber designs; among others, he helped design the composite bomber system, Mistel. In 1944, he was placed in command of the newly formed Kampfgeschwader 200 (KG 200) and was in charge of all Luftwaffe special missions. Baumbach was promoted to Oberstleutnant on 15 November 1944 and was the acting General der Kampfflieger for two months.

On the last stage on the war, during the days of the Flensburg Government, Baumbach was placed in charge of the government air squadron.

After the war, Baumbach spent three years as a prisoner of war before he moved to Argentina where he worked as a test pilot. He died in a plane crash on 20 October 1953 near Berazategui, while evaluating a British Lancaster bomber for the Argentine Air Force. He was interred in his hometown, Cloppenburg, Lower Saxony. The street "Werner-Baumbach-Straße" in Cloppenburg was named after him.

Awards
 Front Flying Clasp of the Luftwaffe for Bomber Pilots in Gold with Pennant "200"
 in Silver (22 March 1941)
 in Gold (1942)
 Pilot/Observer Badge in Gold with Diamonds (14 July 1941)
 Iron Cross (1939)
 2nd Class (28 September 1939)
 1st Class (4 May 1940)
 Knight's Cross of the Iron Cross with Oak Leaves and Swords
 Knight's Cross on 8 May 1940 as Leutnant and pilot in the 5./Kampfgeschwader 30
 20th Oak Leaves on 14 July 1941 as Oberleutnant and Staffelkapitän of the 1./Kampfgeschwader 30
 16th Swords on 17 August 1942 as Hauptmann and Gruppenkommandeur of the I./Kampfgeschwader 30
The Order of Military Merit - Bulgarian

Notes

References

Citations

Bibliography

 
 
 
 
 Speer, Albert (1970). Inside the Third Reich: Memoirs. Simon and Schuster Inc., 1970. 
 
 

1916 births
1953 deaths
German prisoners of war in World War II held by the United Kingdom
German test pilots
German World War II pilots
German World War II bomber pilots
Luftwaffe pilots
People from Cloppenburg
People from Oldenburg (state)
Recipients of the Knight's Cross of the Iron Cross with Oak Leaves and Swords
Victims of aviation accidents or incidents in 1953
Victims of aviation accidents or incidents in Argentina
Military personnel from Lower Saxony